Stenidea setipennis is a species of beetle in the family Cerambycidae. It was described by Stephan von Breuning in 1970. It is known from Eritrea.

References

Endemic fauna of Eritrea
setipennis
Beetles described in 1970